The 1907 Kaiserpreis was a Grand Prix motor race held at Taunus on 13–14 June 1907.

Heat 1

References

Kaiserpreis
Kaiserpreis
Kaiserpreis
Auto races in Germany